St. John the Baptist Ukrainian Catholic Church is a parish of the Ukrainian Greek Catholic Church located in Syracuse, New York, at the corner of Tompkins Street and Wilbur Avenue. Constructed in 1913, it was the first Eastern Catholic church in the city.

In recent years, local business owner, Peter Coleman, resurrected the idea within the local Ukrainian community of erecting a statue of the Ukrainian Bard Taras Shevchenko in front of the church. A committee consisting of Ukrainian-Americans was formed to undertake the task of designing and erecting the monument to Taras Shevchenko. The local Ukrainian community along with several neighbors in Tipperary Hill section of Syracuse raised the necessary funds for the monument. The monument to Taras Shevchenko was dedicated in the autumn of 2005. Attending the dedication and unveiling ceremony were Syracuse Mayor Matt Driscoll, the Consulate General of Ukraine, New York State representatives and a multitude of Ukrainian-Americans. Following the unveiling ceremony, a commemorative concert was held at the Syracuse Ukrainian National Home.

Church groups

According to church records, the following groups were organized:

 1893 - Branch 34 of the Greek Catholic Union (Soiedineniie) – Organized by the first immigrants, Rusyns or Rusnaky.
 1900 - Sts. Peter & Paul Society, Branch 39 of the Ruskii Narodnŷi Soiuz/later Ukrainian National Association – Organized by the Lemko immigrants.
 1912 - St. Olga's Providence Association
 1921 - Ukrainian Church Choir
 1921 - Amateur Dramatic Circle
 1925 - Sacred Heart Society
 1926 - Ukrainian-American Citizens Club
 1932 - Catholic Daughters
 1933 - Ukrainian Catholic Youth Organization
 1937 - Ukrainian Central Committee
 1946 - Ukrainian-American Catholic War Veterans, Post 560
 1950 - Junior Sodality
 1950 - Altar Society
 1955 - Mother's Club (school)
 1955 - Holy Name Society
 1997 - Our Lady of Mercy Society

References 

Roman Catholic Diocese of Syracuse
Churches in Syracuse, New York
National parishes
Churches completed in 1913
Christian organizations established in 1900
Rusyn-American culture in New York (state)
Ukrainian-American culture in New York (state)
Ukrainian Catholic churches in the United States
Eastern Catholic churches in New York (state)